The 1975 Rhode Island Rams football team was an American football team that represented the University of Rhode Island in the Yankee Conference during the 1975 NCAA Division II football season. In their sixth and final season under head coach Jack Gregory, the Rams compiled a 2–8 record (1–4 against conference opponents) and finished in a tie for last place in the conference. Key players included Little All-American running back Rich Remondino.

Schedule

References

Rhode Island
Rhode Island Rams football seasons
1975 in sports in Rhode Island